Arctic Vets is a Canadian documentary television series, which premiered on CBC Television in February 2021. The series profiles the veterinary team at the Assiniboine Park Conservancy in Winnipeg, Manitoba, who specialize in the care of Arctic animals such as seals, polar bears and muskox.

Episodes

Season 1

Season 2

References

2020s Canadian documentary television series
2021 Canadian television series debuts
CBC Television original programming
Television shows filmed in Winnipeg